Hajji Gawhar Khanum (Persian: حاجیه گوهر خانم) is the first female poet and astronomer of the 19th-century Qajar empire whose poetry has been printed. Her father is Musa Khan Qavanlu, and her mother Tiqun Khanum - is the 12th daughter of Fath-Ali Shah. Her divan (large collection of poems) was printed in May 1902 in Isfahan. Printing was funded by lrzá Ahmad Khán Fátih al-Mulk, the city's major constitutional supporter. Her writings are composed of Shi’i religious poetry, giving praise to the Prophet, Imams, and Fatimah. Gawhar also praises Qajar women.

Relationship with the Royal Qajar family 
Mahd-i Ulya, a mother of the Naser al-Din Sháh, played a significant role in Gawhar's poetic journey, whereas poetry dedicated both to the mother and the son, circulates. When Mahd-i Ulya's attention fell on Gawhar's literary work, she invited her to participate in a women-only gathering, composing the poetry for them. Gawhar also wrote about the sister of the Shah -  'Izzat al-Dawla. She described her relationship with the princess as a “heteroerotic romance between her as lover and the princess as the perfect embodiment of human beauty”. In her writings she also referred to the shah's daughter as the “pearl of the kingly sea”, ‘the light of the whole world”, praising her beauty, her “silvery chest”, and her “sun-like face”.

References

19th-century Iranian women writers
19th-century Iranian poets
People of Qajar Iran